Landscape and Urban Planning is a monthly peer-reviewed academic journal published by Elsevier. It covers landscape science (including landscape planning,  design, and architecture), urban and regional planning, landscape and ecological engineering, landscape and urban ecology, and other practice-oriented fields. The editors-in-chief are Joan I. Nassauer (University of Michigan) and Peter H. Verburg (Vrije Universiteit Amsterdam).

History
The journal was established in 1974 as Landscape Planning under founding editor-in-chief Arnold E. Weddle. In 1986 the journal was renamed and merged with the journal Urban Ecology. In 1988 the journal also incorporated Reclamation and Revegetation Research.

Editors-in-chief

Landscape and Urban Planning
The following persons are or have been editor-in-chief of Landscape and Urban Planning:
Joan I. Nassauer (University of Michigan): June 2014–present
Peter H. Verburg (Vrije Universiteit Amsterdam): October 2018-present
Wei-Ning Xiang (Tongji University): November 2011–October 2018
Paul H. Gobster (United States Forest Service): October 2010–June 2014
Jon E. Rodiek (Texas A&M University): 1991–September 2010
Michael M. McCarthy (Texas A&M University): 1991–June 1992
Arnold E. Weddle (University of Sheffield): 1974–1990

Urban Ecology
The following persons have been editor-in-chief of Urban Ecology:
Amos Rapoport (University of Wisconsin–Milwaukee): April 1981–1986
Royce LaNier (University of Wisconsin–Milwaukee): 1975–March 1981

Reclamation and Revegetation Research
The following persons have been editor-in-chief of Reclamation and Revegetation Research:
Mohan K. Wali (University of North Dakota): 1982–1988
Edward M. Watkin (Mine Waste Reclamation, Guelph, Ontario): 1983–1988

Abstracting and indexing
The journal is abstracted and indexed in:

According to the Journal Citation Reports, the journal has a 2018 impact factor of 5.144.

References

External links

Landscape ecology
Landscape architecture
Urban planning
Urban design
English-language journals
Monthly journals
Elsevier academic journals
Creative Commons-licensed journals
Hybrid open access journals
Publications established in 1974
Urban studies and planning journals